Pterolophia jugosa is a species of beetle in the family Cerambycidae. It was described by Henry Walter Bates in 1873.

Subspecies
 Pterolophia jugosa jugosa Bates, 1873
 Pterolophia jugosa carinissima Takakuwa, 1984

References

jugosa
Beetles described in 1873